Paraburkholderia oxyphila is a gram-negative, aerobic, non-spore-forming, non motile, rod-shaped bacterium from the genus Paraburkholderia and the family Burkholderiaceae which was isolated from acidic forest soil.

References

oxyphila
Bacteria described in 2011